Homer Croy (March 11, 1883 – May 24, 1965), was an American author and occasional screenwriter who wrote fiction and non-fiction books about life in the Midwestern United States. He also wrote several popular biographies, including books on outlaw Jesse James, humorist Will Rogers, and film director D.W. Griffith.

Life and career

Croy was born on a farm northwest of Maryville, Missouri. He attended the University of Missouri from 1903 to 1907, but did not graduate after failing an English course his senior year. While attending college, Croy edited the university yearbook and wrote for the Kansas City Star. After leaving college, Croy worked on the St. Louis Post-Dispatch, and later for Theodore Dreiser in New York City.

Croy published his first book, When to Lock the Stable, in 1914. During World War I, he was production manager in Paris, France, for the Community Motion Picture Bureau, which distributed movies to Allied troops.  His first successful book was West of the Water Tower, published in 1923.  It dealt with hypocrisy in a small town, "Junction City," which was a thinly disguised version of Maryville; a sequel, R.F.D. #3, appeared the following year.

Croy's most famous work was the novel They Had to See Paris (1926) which is about a rural couple from Missouri on a European trip. The book was filmed in 1929 as the first talking picture to star Will Rogers.

Croy had a long but intermittent association with the motion picture industry. Many of his novels and stories were adapted for the screen, and he also directed a series of short travelogue films in 1914–1915; he received screenwriting credits on a handful of feature films in the 1930s. In addition to his biography of D.W. Griffith, he also wrote about the film industry in his 1918 book How Motion Pictures Are Made and a 1932 novel Headed for Hollywood.

Croy's novel The Lady from Colorado was the basis for an opera of the same title by Robert Ward; Croy was in attendance at its 1964 world premiere by the Central City Opera.

Croy was a good friend of the author Dale Carnegie and Carnegie's 1936 book How to Win Friends and Influence People is dedicated to him.

Croy was married to Mae Belle Savell Croy, who was born in Bagdad, Florida. The couple had one daughter, Carol, who was born in 1922.

Croy died in New York City on May 25, 1965, age 82.

Selected bibliography
 1914  When to Lock the Stable
 1918  How Motion Pictures Are Made
 1918  Boone Stop
 1920  Turkey Bowman
 1923  West of the Water Tower (made into the lost 1923 silent film West of the Water Tower)
 1924  R.F.D. No. 3
 1926  They Had to See Paris (made into Will Rogers' first sound film They Had to See Paris in 1929)
 1929  Coney Island
 1932  Headed for Hollywood
 1938  Sixteen Hands (made into the 1939 film I'm from Missouri)
 1942  Family Honeymoon
 1947  Corn Country
 1949  Jesse James Was My Neighbor
 1952  He Hanged Them High
 1953  Our Will Rogers
 1959  Star Maker: The Story of D.W. Griffith

Selected motion picture credits
 1932  Down to Earth (co-screenplay with Edwin J. Burke; a follow-up to They Had to See Paris)
 1933  The Cohens and Kellys in Trouble (one of five credited screenwriters)
 1936  The Harvester (one of four credited screenwriters)

See also

Lee Shippey, with whom Croy roomed in Paris during World War I

References

External links

University of Missouri biography
MSN Filmography

Article by Croy about Will Rogers
Contemporary Anthology of Croy's best Midwestern Nonfictions

1883 births
1965 deaths
People from Maryville, Missouri
Novelists from Missouri
American humorists
20th-century American novelists
American autobiographers
American male screenwriters
American male novelists
American male short story writers
20th-century American biographers
American male biographers
20th-century American short story writers
20th-century American male writers
Screenwriters from Missouri
20th-century American screenwriters